Luiz Carlos Flores (born 28 October 1950) is a Brazilian cyclist. He competed in the individual road race at the 1972 Summer Olympics.

References

External links
 

1950 births
Living people
Brazilian male cyclists
Brazilian road racing cyclists
Olympic cyclists of Brazil
Cyclists at the 1972 Summer Olympics
Place of birth missing (living people)
Pan American Games medalists in cycling
Pan American Games silver medalists for Brazil
Cyclists at the 1971 Pan American Games
20th-century Brazilian people
21st-century Brazilian people